"I Wish" is a song by American R&B singer Carl Thomas, released as the second single from his debut album Emotional. The hit song spent six weeks at number-one on the US R&B chart and also peaked at number twenty on the Billboard Hot 100.

Remixes
There are three remixes of the song; the official remix features P. Diddy and LL Cool J and there is also a remix that features Prodigy and Shyne. The DJ Clue mixtape remix features LL Cool J, Prodigy and Shyne.

Charts

Year-end charts

References

1999 songs
2000 singles
Carl Thomas (singer) songs
Bad Boy Records singles
Arista Records singles
Music videos directed by Marcus Raboy
Songs written by Mike City
Songs about infidelity